Manitoba Provincial Road 218 (PR 218) is a provincial road in the southeastern region of Manitoba, Canada.

Route description

Most of PR 218 is paved, except for the southernmost part between Ridgeville and PR 200, which is a gravel road.  This southern section was not originally part of PR 218; it was added in 1992 to replace the partly-decommissioned PR 209.

References

External links
Official Manitoba Highway Map

218